Julián Guillermo Rojas (born February 28, 1990) is a Colombian footballer currently playing for Club Independiente Santa Fe of the Colombian First Division.

References
 Profile at BDFA 
 

1990 births
Living people
Colombian footballers
Academia F.C. players
Cúcuta Deportivo footballers
Club Atlético Banfield footballers
Independiente Medellín footballers
Independiente Santa Fe footballers
Colombian expatriate footballers
Expatriate footballers in Argentina
Association football midfielders
Footballers from Bogotá
20th-century Colombian people
21st-century Colombian people